Willy Goldberger (1898–1961) was a German-Spanish cinematographer. On some Spanish films he is credited as Guillermo Goldberger.

Selected filmography

 The Heiress of the Count of Monte Cristo (1919)
 The Yellow Diplomat (1920)
 The Law of the Desert (1920)
 Fanny Elssler (1920)
 The Princess of the Nile (1920)
 The Convict of Cayenne (1921)
 The Buried Self (1921)
 The House in Dragon Street (1921)
 Trix, the Romance of a Millionairess (1921)
 Miss Beryll (1921)
 Memoirs of a Film Actress (1921)
 The Golden Plague (1921)
 About the Son (1921)
 Hazard (1921)
 The Lodging House for Gentleman (1922)
 Tania, the Woman in Chains (1922)
 Raskolnikow (1923)
 The Man at Midnight (1924)
 The Power of Darkness (1924)
 Curfew (1925)
 People in Need (1925)
 Ash Wednesday (1925)
 The Dice Game of Life (1925)
 Professor Imhof  (1926)
 The Good Reputation (1926)
 German Hearts on the German Rhine (1926)
 The Clever Fox (1926)
 Children's Souls Accuse You (1927)
 The Awakening of Woman (1927)
 Alpine Tragedy (1927)
 The Woman Who Couldn't Say No (1927)
 U-9 Weddigen (1927)
 Light-Hearted Isabel (1927)
 Serenissimus and the Last Virgin (1928)
 The Abduction of the Sabine Women (1928)
 Princess Olala (1928)
 Adam and Eve (1928)
 Casanova's Legacy (1928)
 Modern Pirates (1928)
 Column X (1929)
 Perjury  (1929)
 My Daughter's Tutor (1929)
 The Green Monocle (1929)
 Father and Son (1929)
 Two Hearts in Waltz Time (1930)
 The Song Is Ended (1930)
 Delicatessen (1930)
 Panic in Chicago (1931)
 Madame Bluebeard  (1931)
 Weekend in Paradise (1931)
 My Leopold (1931)
 I Go Out and You Stay Here (1931)
 The Theft of the Mona Lisa (1931)
 Road to Rio (1931)
 Schubert's Dream of Spring (1931)
 Hooray, It's a Boy! (1931)
 The Merry Wives of Vienna (1931)
 No Money Needed (1932)
 A Man with Heart (1932)
 I Do Not Want to Know Who You Are (1932)
 Tell Me Tonight (1932)
 One Night with You (1932)
 A Bit of Love (1932)
 Monsieur, Madame and Bibi (1932)
 The Testament of Cornelius Gulden (1932)
 The Rebel (1932)
 The Racokzi March (1933)
 Madame Wants No Children (1933)
 What Women Dream (1933)
 A Precocious Girl (1934)
 Everything for the Company (1935)
 The Wicked Carabel (1935)
 Her Highness Dances the Waltz (1935)
 Fräulein Lilli (1936)
 Cafe Moscow (1936)
 Witches' Night (1937)
 Happy Vestköping (1937)
 Comrades in Uniform (1938)
 Whirlwind (1941)
 Malvaloca (1942)
 Cristina Guzmán (1943)
 El 13 – 13 (1943)
 Life Begins at Midnight (1944)
 Esa pareja feliz (1951)
 Service at Sea (1951)

External links

1898 births
1961 deaths
German cinematographers
Jewish emigrants from Nazi Germany to Spain
Spanish cinematographers
Film people from Berlin